There are over 20,000 Grade II* listed buildings in England.  This page is a list of these buildings in Melton.

Melton

|}

Notes

External links

 Melton
listed buildings
Borough of Melton